Weiler is a village in the commune of Putscheid, in north-eastern Luxembourg.  , the village had a population of 143.

Putscheid
Villages in Luxembourg